Wheat flour is a powder made from the grinding of wheat used for human consumption. Wheat varieties are called "soft" or "weak" if gluten content is low, and are called "hard" or "strong" if they have high gluten content. Hard flour, or bread flour, is high in gluten, with 12% to 14% gluten content, and its dough has elastic toughness that holds its shape well once baked. Soft flour is comparatively low in gluten and thus results in a loaf with a finer, crumbly texture. Soft flour is usually divided into cake flour, which is the lowest in gluten, and pastry flour, which has slightly more gluten than cake flour.

In terms of the parts of the grain (the grass fruit) used in flour—the endosperm or protein/starchy part, the germ or protein/fat/vitamin-rich part, and the bran or fiber part—there are three general types of flour. White flour is made from the endosperm only. Brown flour includes some of the grain's germ and bran, while whole grain or wholemeal flour is made from the entire grain, including the bran, endosperm, and germ. Germ flour is made from the endosperm and germ, excluding the bran.

Milling 
To produce refined (white) wheat flour, grain is usually tempered, i.e. moisture added to the grain, before milling, to optimize milling efficiency.  This softens the starchy "endosperm" portion of the wheat kernel, which will be separated out in the milling process to produce what is known to consumers as white flour. The addition of moisture also stiffens the bran and ultimately reduces the energy input required to shatter the kernel, while at the same time avoiding the shattering of bran and germ particles to be separated out in this milling process by sieving or sifting.

The endosperm portion of the kernel makes up about 80% of the volume and is desirable because the products made from this white flour are often considered to have milder flavor, smoother texture, and, in the case of bread, greater volume.  The balance of the kernel is composed of the bran and the germ which tend to be coarser. With the invention of the roller milling system in the late 19th century, the bran and the germ were able to be removed, dramatically improving the appeal of baked products to the public.

The moistened grain is first passed through the series of break rollers, then sieved to separate out the fine particles that make up white flour. The balance are intermediate particles of endosperm (otherwise known as product middling or farina) and coarse particles of bran and germ. The middling then makes multiple passes through the reduction rolls, and is again sieved after each pass to maximize extraction of white flour from the endosperm, while removing coarser bran and germ particles.

To produce whole wheat flour, 100% of the bran and germ must be reintroduced to the white flour that the roller milling system was originally designed to separate it from. Therefore, these elements are first ground on another mill (usually a pin mill).  These finer bran and germ fractions are then reintroduced to the endosperm (white flour) to produce whole wheat flour made of 100% of the kernel of wheat.

Types

Wheat flour is available in many varieties; the categorization is regional, and the same name may have several different regional meanings.

Canada
Whole wheat flour in Canada may have up to 5% of the grain removed; most of the germ is often removed to prevent the flour from going rancid.
Whole grain flour contains the whole grain, including bran, germ and endosperm, but not the chaff

Fiji
Sharp flour is produced in Fiji and primarily used in Indian cuisine.

Indian wheat flours
Indian flours are generally categorized by how much of the grain is stripped away.
 Wheat powder/flour – 'whole grain' (mixture of germ, endosperm and bran)
 Atta flour – mixture of endosperm and bran
 Maida flour – endosperm, bleached; a very white flour, similar to the American bleached flour
 Sooji/rava – coarse-ground endosperm.

Southeast Asia
Tang flour or wheat starch is a type of wheat flour used primarily in Chinese cuisine for making the outer layer of dumplings and buns. It is also used in Vietnamese cuisine, where it is called bột lọc trong.

United States
American flours are categorized by gluten/protein content, processing, and use.
All-purpose or plain flour is a blended wheat with a protein content lower than bread flour, ranging between 9% and 12%. Depending on brand or the region where it is purchased, it may be composed of all hard or soft wheats, but is usually a blend of the two, and can range from low protein content to moderately high. It is marketed as an inexpensive alternative to bakers' flour which is acceptable for most household baking needs.
Bread flour or strong flour is always made from hard wheat, usually hard spring wheat. It has a very high protein content, between 10% and 13%, making it excellent for yeast bread baking. It can be white or whole wheat or in between.
Cake flour is a finely milled white flour made from soft wheat. It has very low protein content, between 8% and 10%, making it suitable for soft-textured cakes and cookies. The higher protein content of other flours would make the cakes tough. Related to cake flour are masa harina (from maize), maida flour (from wheat or tapioca), and pure starches.
Durum flour is made from Durum wheat and is suited for pasta making, traditional pizza and flatbread for doner kebab.
Graham flour is a special type of whole wheat flour. The endosperm is finely ground, as in white flour, while the bran and germ are coarsely ground. Graham flour is uncommon outside of the United States (but see atta flour, a similar product, below). Graham flour is the basis of true graham crackers.
Instant flour is pregelatinized (precooked) for easier incorporation in gravies and sauces.
Pastry flour or cookie flour or cracker flour has slightly higher protein content than cake flour but lower than all-purpose flour. Its protein content ranges between 9% and 10%. It is available as a white flour, a whole-wheat flour, or a white flour with the germ retained but not the bran. It is suitable for pie pastry and tarts, some cookies, muffins, biscuits and other quick breads. Flour is shaken through a sieve to reduce the amount of lumps for cooking pastry.
Whole-wheat flour contains the wheat germ, endosperm and bran
White flour or refined flour contains only the endosperm
 Whole-wheat white flour is white flour that contains the endososperm, bran, and germ 
Enriched flour is white flour with nutrients added to compensate for the removal of the bran and germ
Bleached flour is a white flour treated with flour bleaching agents to whiten it (freshly milled flour is yellowish) and give it more gluten-producing potential. Oxidizing agents are usually employed, most commonly organic peroxides like acetone peroxide or benzoyl peroxide, nitrogen dioxide, or chlorine. A similar effect can be achieved by letting the flour oxidize with oxygen in the air ("natural aging") for approximately 10 days; however, this process is more expensive due to the time required. Flour bleached with benzoyl peroxide has been prohibited in the UK since 1997. 
Bromated flour has a maturing agent added. The agent's role is to help with developing gluten, a role similar to the flour bleaching agents. Bromate is usually used. Other choices are phosphates, ascorbic acid, and malted barley. Bromated flour has been banned in much of the world, as bromate is classified as possibly carcinogenic in humans (Group 2B) by the International Agency for Research on Cancer (IARC), but remains available in the United States.
Self-rising or self-raising flour is white flour that is sold premixed with chemical leavening agents. It was invented by Henry Jones. Self-rising flour is typically composed of the following ratio:
1 cup (100 g) flour
 teaspoons (3 g) baking powder
a pinch to  teaspoon (1 g or less) salt

Other
Spelt flour is produced from the type of wheat called spelt. It is less commonly used in modern cooking than other wheat varieties. It is still used for specialty baking.

Baking characteristics

W index
The W index is an indicator of a flour's strength which is commonly used by professional bakers. It is measured using a Chopin Alveograph, and it takes into account both the toughness and elasticity of the flour's gluten. The W index is often not listed on commercial flour packaging, but it can be approximated based the flour's protein content.

In general, a higher W index flour will require a longer rising time for leavened bread products. Higher W index flour better retains the CO2 produced during the fermentation process, because the gluten traps the produced gas.

Zeleny sedimentation value
The Zeleny sedimentation value is a measurement of how much of the flour sediments during a set period of time in a lactic acid solution. It is used to predict the baking characteristics of a particular cultivar. Since this test has costs associated with it, the Zeleny value may itself be estimated by EM irradiation and spectral analysis of the dry material. Where present, damage by insect pests and fungal diseases are the primary determinants of the sedimentation value, overwhelming the underlying genetic characteristics.

National Flour

United Kingdom

During World War II, the British government promoted National Flour; it was adopted in 1942 as a healthy and economic alternative to importing wheat. The flour is described as being of 85% extraction, i.e. containing more of the whole wheat grain than refined flour, generally described as 70% extraction at the time. Parliamentary questions on the exact constitution of National Flour in 1943 reveal that it was "milled from a grist consisting of 90 per cent wheat and 10 per cent diluent grains. The diluent grains were barley, oats and rye and customary improvers were "certain oxidising agents which improve the quality of the bread baked from the flour, and their nature depends on the kind of grain used, whether hard or soft". A survey of the composition of National Flour was conducted for the period 1946–1950. National Flour was discontinued in 1956 against the recommendations of the Medical Research Council as the government considered that the addition of nutritional supplements to refined flour removed the necessity for using National Flour on health grounds.

Kenya
National Flour was also a term for a flour introduced in Kenya by the colonial government which contained 70% wheat flour and 30% maize flour.

See also
Farina
Flour
Grist mill
Enriched flour

References

 
Flour
Flour